The 2016 Stadium Super Trucks Series was the fourth season of the Stadium Super Trucks series. After two seasons as Speed Energy Formula Off-Road, the name was quietly phased out in series branding by 2016 as it became the Speed Energy Stadium Super Trucks presented by Traxxas.

2015 champion Sheldon Creed defended his title when he recorded twelve wins. Matthew Brabham finished second in the championship with 570 points, a 75-point differential between him and Creed, while Robby Gordon took third.

Drivers

Schedule

Season summary

The 2016 season began at Adelaide Street Circuit. Indianapolis 500 driver Matthew Brabham, who ran the SST round at Toronto in 2015, returned to the series for Adelaide, while local driver Travis Milburn made his SST debut in the race weekend; other Australians in the field included Paul Morris, Rob Cowie, Matt Mingay, Greg Gartner, and 2016 Dakar Rally winner Toby Price. Defending champion Sheldon Creed started eleventh in the twelve-driver grid but drove his way through the field. In front, Price led the race until lap six, when he collided into the wall. Morris inherited the lead and dueled with Creed for the position. As the two entered the final ramps, Morris went sideways and missed the second jump, enabling Creed to take the win. On the first lap of the second race, Mingay rolled his truck as he entered turn fourteen. Mingay nearly landed on Burt Jenner, but he was able to avoid Mingay's truck. Jenner battled with Price for much of the race before passing him on lap six, holding off Gordon to win. Mingay's struggles continued in the third race when he was spun by Price on lap three as he entered the ramp. Creed won the round.

The series returned to the United States with the Firestone Grand Prix of St. Petersburg, the third consecutive season that the trucks raced at the street course. Traxxas drivers swept the weekend's two races with Creed winning the first and Keegan Kincaid the second; Tyler McQuarrie joined the two on the podium in both races. Dustin Scott ran his first SST race at St. Petersburg, finishing sixth in his debut round.

Creed swept the Toyota Grand Prix of Long Beach's two races. On the final lap of the second race, Pat O'Keefe landed off a jump erratically, causing his truck to slide over the second ramp before hitting the catchfence dividing the track from pit road. The wreck ended the race as Creed was declared the winner. Dubai 24 Hour driver Khaled Al Mudhaf made his SST debut over the weekend, finishing tenth and eighth.

At the Chevrolet Detroit Belle Isle Grand Prix, series veteran Arie Luyendyk Jr. made his season debut. Brabham recorded a weekend sweep as he won the two official races.  The slate originally featured three races, but the second round saw Mingay's truck flip on lap three, prompting a red flag and suspending the race. Mingay was taken to Detroit Receiving Hospital for facial injuries, and was eventually placed under a coma for five days as he underwent jaw and brain surgeries. Mingay returned to Australia after he recovered, but lost three weeks' worth of memories. Officially, Race 2 is not included in the series' records.

In support of the injured Mingay, Gordon drove his No. 2 Hot Wheels truck when the series raced in the Castrol Edge Townsville 400 for the first time. Creed, Gordon, and Viso won the three races, with Viso taking his first win of 2016; Creed, who finished second and fourth in the other two rounds, scored the weekend victory. Despite his Race 2 win, Gordon finished at the back in Races 1 and 3 due to mechanical issues.

At Honda Indy Toronto, 17-time motocross champion Sara Price made her series debut, becoming the first female driver in SST history. Also debuting in the series at Toronto was Champ Car and NASCAR driver Max Papis, while 2003 CART champion Paul Tracy, who last ran an SST race in 2014, returned to the series. Traxxas teammates Brabham and Creed battled one another for the weekend's two wins, with the former winning Race 1 and the latter Race 2.

In August, SST partnered with TORC: The Off Road Championship to race the Dirt Track at Charlotte Motor Speedway; it was the series' first dirt track racing event since Valvoline Raceway in 2015. To accommodate the stadium trucks, track officials added a 36-inch tall aluminum ramp to the start/finish line. NASCAR drivers Kenny Wallace and Brian Ickler made their series debuts, though Wallace was replaced by TORC driver Jessie Johnson for Race 2 as Wallace had television obligations with the NASCAR Cup Series; Johnson, who finished third, ran his first SST race since 2013. Creed won both rounds.

Entering the series' Sand Sports Super Show weekend, tragedy took place when Gordon's parents were found dead in their nearby Orange, California home; in a statement released the next day, Gordon announced the race weekend would go on as planned, but added that "to switch from what happened to a business mode really stinks." Heat races were held before the two finals, with SST newcomer Troy Diede starting on the pole as a result. In the first race, Brabham took the lead at the start, while Gordon moved his way up from the back of the field. Late in the race, Gordon took the Joker Lap to get past Brabham and claim the win. P. J. Jones, who was substituting for O'Keefe in the Safecraft Safety Equipment truck, was able to pass Brabham to take second. With six laps left in the race, Morris flipped his truck but was able to finish sixth. Creed, who finished eighth in Race 1 after breaking an axle, dominated the second with Brabham tailing.

On October 13–16, the series went to Baja California to run the inaugural Mike's Peak Hill Climb Challenge, held at Mike's Sky Rancho. The hillclimbing event featured 144 competitors across various vehicle classes including SST. Held on a  course with 203 turns, water crossings and cattle grids, it marked the first time a stadium truck raced on such a track. Gordon dedicated the hillclimb to his late father Bob Gordon; he remarked "if I would have stopped this event, he would have been mad at me." Including Gordon and Creed, the field of competitors featured a variety of drivers like an eleven-year old racer with his father serving as co-driver, and 2015 Baja 500 winner Apdaly Lopez, who won the SST gold medal at X Games Austin 2014 and entered the hillclimb in an unlimited truck. Red Bull off-road racer Bryce Menzies was also an entrant but did not compete due to injury; in his place, he challenged the SST drivers to beat his time of 14:20. On Friday, Gordon recorded the fastest time of the 16-driver field with a time of 17:08, followed by Creed with 17:29. Gordon once again led the grid on Saturday with a time of 16:51, a 22-second advantage over second-placed Creed.

The season came to a close with the Castrol Gold Coast 600 at Surfers Paradise Street Circuit. In practice for Friday's race, teammates Morris and Price collided as they entered a turn, causing the two to roll over as they went into the barrier. Race 1 saw multiple wrecks, including Craig Dontas taking out the chicane barriers that forced the competition caution to be expedited to facilitate repairs, with Brabham also landing on Jones' truck as they raced to the finish for second; Creed won by 12.182 seconds, one of the widest margins in SST history. Gordon, returning to the No. 2 truck, won Race 2 while Creed held off Brabham for Race 3. Gold Coast would not return to the schedule until 2019 when it also served as that year's finale.

Creed concluded 2016 with a series-high twelve wins, quadruple that of the second-most (three apiece by Gordon and Brabham). With 645 total points, he scored his second SST championship ahead of Brabham's 570.

Results and standings

Race results

Drivers' championship

Notes

References

Stadium Super Trucks
Stadium Super Trucks
Stadium Super Trucks